The 1989 World Badminton Grand Prix was the seventh edition of the World Badminton Grand Prix finals. It was held in Singapore, from December 6 to December 10, 1989.

Final results

References
Smash: World Grand Prix Finals, Singapore 1989

World Grand Prix
World Badminton Grand Prix
B
Badminton tournaments in Singapore
1989 in Singaporean sport